Isaac Bullard was an early 19th-century Pentecostal religious leader who in 1817 founded a short-lived commune in Woodstock, Vermont.

Bibliography
Ham, F. Gerald. "The prophet and the Mummyjums: Isaac Bullard and the Vermont pilgrims of 1817," The Wisconsin Magazine of History, Vol. 56, No. 4 (Summer, 1973), pp. 290–299.

People from Woodstock, Vermont
Free love advocates
Year of death missing
Year of birth missing